Bagan (formerly Pagan) is an ancient city and a UNESCO World Heritage Site in Myanmar. During the 11th and 13th centuries, more than 10,000 Buddhist temples, pagodas and monasteries were constructed in the Bagan mainly lying in the Bagan Archaeological Zone. A list of those pagodas and temples are listed below.

List

References

Pagodas in Myanmar
Bagan